Tyrel Jackson Williams (born March 16, 1997) is an American actor. He starred as Leo Dooley in the Disney XD series Lab Rats. Williams also co-starred in the 2014 Disney XD television film Pants on Fire. From 2017 to 2020 he co-starred in the comedy series Brockmire.

Early life 
Williams was born in Westchester County, New York on March 16, 1997.

Career 
Williams had roles in the feature films The Naked Brothers Band: The Movie in 2005, and Failure to Launch in 2006. He has also appeared in national commercials for companies such as Target, Verizon, McDonald's, Chex Mix and General Mills.  Williams appeared in two episodes of the television series Everybody Hates Chris starting in 2005, as a younger version of Chris who was played by his older brother Tyler James Williams.

In 2011 Williams was cast in the Disney XD series Lab Rats which premiered in 2012, playing the main role of Leo who stumbles upon the existence of the titular bionic heroes. He had a starring role in the 2014 Disney XD television film Pants on Fire. He was also a singing actor for Tyrone in the Nickelodeon animated television series The Backyardigans.

In 2016 Williams was cast in the role of Charles, an internet whiz who has been hired to be the assistant to a minor league baseball team and its sports announcer (Hank Azaria), in the 2017 IFC comedy series Brockmire.

Filmography

Awards and nominations

References

External links 
 
 

1997 births
Living people
21st-century African-American people
African-American male actors
African-American male child actors
American male child actors
American male television actors
People from Westchester County, New York